The Borgward Hansa 1500 is a medium-sized automobile manufactured by the Bremen based auto-manufacturer Carl F. W. Borgward GmbH from 1949 until 1954. It was first presented at the Geneva Motor Show in March 1949  and production commenced on 13 October 1949. The similar Hansa 1800 was introduced in 1952. The Hansa was replaced by the Borgward Isabella in 1954.

It is often seen as the first all new model launched by the German auto industry after the war. Introduced nearly four years before the better remembered ’Ponton Mercedes’ the Hansa featured the then revolutionary ponton, three-box design that subsequently became mainstream in Germany and across much of Europe.

Hansa 1500
The car was launched as a two- or four-door saloon with an all-steel body built around a central steel frame, which bears a resemblance to a 1949 Ford. The wings were fully integrated into the bodywork, and the passenger cabin filled the full width of the car. At a time when competitor vehicles from Opel Olympia and Mercedes-Benz W136 were still based on conventional looking prewar designs, the interior width of the Hansa, emphasized by the inclusion of bench seats both at the back and in the front, attracted favourable press comment. The car was seen as a genuine six-seater. Also noteworthy in 1949 was the separate lid that permitted the boot / trunk to be accessed from outside the car. At the other end, the bonnet / hood was hinged at the side and could be opened from either the left or the right side as necessary. Instead of traditional semaphore style direction indicators, the Hansa featured flashing lights for use as direction indicators, the flashing being replicated within the tri-functional rear lights which included within a single unit rear lights and brake lights along with the US style flashing direction indicators.

The driver was faced by a steering wheel linked to its central boss by three sets of four thin spoke like rods. The design of the steering wheel, reminiscent of the early Porsches, ensured minimal disruption of the view of the instruments behind it. Also behind the steering wheel was the column-mounted gear lever.

A two-door estate version and a five-seater two-door cabriolet were available along with a two-seater sports cabriolet. The cabriolets were both assembled by the coach builders Hebmüller in Wülfrath until May 1952.

Engine, transmission and chassis

For 1952 the engine was modified to produce . A  output version of this engine was installed in the sports cabriolet. The Borgward engine had an unusual design where the intake manifold was on top the engine and came through the valve cover, along with the carburettor. Bill Blydenstein tuned several of these engines for racing with some success.
 
The column-mounted gear lever controlled a three-speed gear box or a 2-speed automatic gear box (with a gear-indicator on the column as visible on the photo).

The wheels were independently sprung, the rear wheels being attached to a swing axle and supported by springs with hydraulic shock absorbers. All four wheels were connected to the foot brake via a hydraulic system, while the hand brake was a mechanical one operating on the rear wheels.

Hansa 1800 

1952 saw the introduction of the faster Borgward Hansa 1800, with a 1758 cc 4-cylinder engine producing . The Hansa 1800 benefited from a four-speed gear box, with synchromesh between the top two ratios. The front direction indicators which on the Hansa 1500 had been located beneath the headlights, now migrated to the top of the front wings on the Hansa 1800.

As before, the two- and four-door saloons were complemented by cabriolet and estate versions.

The test car cost £1493 including taxes in the United Kingdom.

References 

Cars introduced in 1949
Hansa 1500 1800
Executive cars
Rear-wheel-drive vehicles